The 2010 Rolex Sports Car Series season was the 11th season of the Grand-Am Rolex Sports Car Series presented by Crown Royal Cask No. 16. It began on January 30 with the Rolex 24 at Daytona and concluded on September 12 at Miller Motorsports Park.

This was Pirelli's final season as the sole tire partner in Rolex Sports Car Series as the company announced that it would not renew its contract at the end of the season and thus coinciding with its entry into Formula One, GP2 Series and GP2 Asia Series in 2011, and its discontinuation of its Grand-Am program. Continental would take over as official Rolex Sports Car Series tire partner beginning from 2011 season.

Schedule
Late in the 2009 season, the series tested at Indianapolis Motor Speedway as a proposed addition to the schedule, however this failed to materialize for 2010.

The final schedule featured many changes and realignments from 2009. Laguna Seca has been removed, leaving Miller as the only race in the Western United States. The race at Lime Rock on Memorial Day returned after being absent in 2009, this time with the DP class in addition to the GT class. Meanwhile, the race at Barber Motorsports Park was held jointly with the IndyCar Series' Indy Grand Prix of Alabama.

Entry list

Team and driver changes
 Supercar Life Racing Team are developing a new BMW-Riley Daytona Prototype that will debut in the 2010 season.

 Pratt & Miller are developing some Chevrolet Camaros to replace the Pontiac GXP.Rs.
 Team Sahlen announced in September 2009, that they will be using Mazda RX-8s in the 2010 season.

 Bryce Miller and Eric Barrett have created the Miller Barrett Racing team for the 2010 season. They will be entering a Porsche 911 GT3.

 J. C. France of Brumos Racing has been suspended indefinitely after being arrested for driving under the influence of cocaine.

 Porsche is scaling back their involvement in the prototype class. Brumos Racing have confirmed they will be running only one Riley-Porsche this season, down from two last year. In addition, Penske Racing have announced they will not be returning at all in 2010, as Porsche has discontinued their support of the team, and they are expanding their IndyCar operation from two cars to three.

 Jimmie Johnson has announced he will again join the #99 GAINSCO/Bob Stallings Racing team for the Rolex 24 at Daytona. Johnson also ran in the other endurance race, the Sahlen's Six Hours at the Glen.  The team began using Earnhardt Childress Racing Technologies Chevrolet engines midway during the year.

 Stevenson Motorsports have entered two Camaros for the 2010 season.

Calendar

Championship standings

Daytona Prototypes

Drivers (Top 16)

Notes
 Drivers denoted by † did not complete sufficient laps in order to score points.

Chassis

Engine

Grand Touring

Drivers (Top 16)

Notes
 Drivers denoted by † did not complete sufficient laps in order to score points.

Engine

References

External links
 The official website of Grand-Am

Rolex Sports Car Series
Rolex Sports Car Series